Tominanga is a genus of sailfin silversides endemic to the Indonesian island of Sulawesi.

Species
There are currently two recognized species in this genus:
 Tominanga aurea Kottelat, 1990
 Tominanga sanguicauda Kottelat, 1990

References 

 
Telmatherininae
Taxonomy articles created by Polbot